Hollywood Park Casino is a casino and sports bar in Inglewood, California. Originally part of the Hollywood Park Racetrack, the casino moved to a new building in 2016 after the closure and demolition of the racetrack in 2013.

History
In 1994, a casino called the Hollywood Park Casino, with a poker card room was added to the Hollywood Park Racetrack complex. The original casino owners were the Hollywood Park Operating Co., which also owned the race track. Afterward, the casino went through a series of owners including Churchill Downs. The racetrack was sold and shut down in December 2013 though the casino operations continued while the current casino building opened in October 2016. The casino is part of the Hollywood Park development which also features SoFi Stadium, home to the Los Angeles Rams and Los Angeles Chargers of the National Football League , and will later include multiple housing, business parks, luxury hotels, a movie theatre, and an open-air shopping center. It was the first building of the complex to be constructed and opened.

Stockbridge Capital Group
The current owners are Stockbridge Capital Group, a San Francisco-based land developer which purchased both the casino and racetrack in 2005 for nearly $260million. Stockbridge, in addition to owning the casino, is also the land developer for the former racetrack site and a joint partner in the NFL stadium. It is planned that the new casino, entertainment complex, and NFL stadium will improve the finances of the casino, which had been on a downturn since the Los Angeles Kings and Los Angeles Lakers left The Forum in May 1999.

New Casino building
The Hollywood Park Casino contains 125 tables for both Poker and California Games. It also features chandelier lighting and big-screen high-definition televisions on the walls. There are separate rooms for high-stakes players and celebrity poker tournaments. It also has a restaurant and sports bar called Century Bar & Grill. Like its predecessor, only card games are allowed in the casino.

Off-track betting
Located in the casino is the Hollywood Park OTB which continues from the former track. It features races from all over North America and Australia on big screens.

References

External links
Official site
Hollywood Park OTB

Casinos in Los Angeles County, California
Hollywood Park
Buildings and structures in Inglewood, California
Casinos completed in 1994
Casinos completed in 2016
2016 establishments in California
1994 establishments in California
Native American casinos
Native American history of California